Fáelán mac Forbasaig (died 786) was a King of Osraige in modern County Kilkenny. He was of the dynasty that ruled over Osraige in the early Christian period known as the Dál Birn and was the son of Forbasach mac Ailella (died 740), a previous king. He ruled from 772 to 786.

The Osraige plunged into civil war after the death of Anmchad mac Con Cherca circa 761. In 786 the annals record that Fáelán was slain in internal conflict among the Osraige.

Notes

References

 Annals of Ulster at CELT: Corpus of Electronic Texts at University College Cork
 Book of Leinster,Reges Ossairge at CELT: Corpus of Electronic Texts at University College Cork

External links
CELT: Corpus of Electronic Texts at University College Cork

Kings of Osraige
8th-century Irish monarchs
786 deaths
People from County Kilkenny
Year of birth unknown